Route 22 is a highway in central Missouri.  Its eastern terminus is at U.S. Route 54 in Mexico; its western terminus is at U.S. Route 63 south of Clark on the Randolph/Boone county line.  Route 22 was one of the original 1922 state highways and originally had an eastern terminus at Route 9 (now U.S. Route 61) in Louisiana.  This section was replaced by U.S. Route 54 in 1926.

Route Description
Route 22 begins at a junction of US Route 63 east of Sturgeon. Route 22 passes north of Sturgeon. Strugeon can be accessed by taking Route V. Route 22 picks up a concurrent with Route 151 for a little bit before passing through Centralia where it met the terminus of Route 151 and Route 124. Next, it passes through Thompson. Then, it passes through Mexico. Through Mexico, it will pick a concurrency with US Route 54 Business Route and Route 15. After leaving Mexico, Route 22 along with US Route 54 Business Route and Route 15 ends at a junction of US Route 54.

Major intersections

References

022
Transportation in Boone County, Missouri
Transportation in Audrain County, Missouri